Ronnie Chance (born June 6, 1968) is an American politician who served in the Georgia State Senate from the 16th district from 2005 to 2015.

References

1968 births
Living people
Republican Party Georgia (U.S. state) state senators